Cristais Paulista is a municipality in the state of São Paulo in Brazil. The population is 8,718 (2020 est.) in an area of 385 km². The elevation is 996 m.

Economy
Coffee is an agricultural product in the area.

References

Municipalities in São Paulo (state)